Anouk Loubie (born 1969) is a French slalom canoeist who competed at the international level from 1986 to 1998.

She won two medals in the K1 team event at the ICF Canoe Slalom World Championships with a gold in 1991 and a silver in 1997.

World Cup individual podiums

References

ICF medalists for Olympic and World Championships - Part 2: rest of flatwater (now sprint) and remaining canoeing disciplines: 1936-2007.

French female canoeists
Living people
1969 births
Medalists at the ICF Canoe Slalom World Championships